Coronaspis is a genus of true bugs belonging to the family Diaspididae.

Species:

Coronaspis coronifera 
Coronaspis malabarica 
Coronaspis malesiana

References

Diaspididae